The 2014–15 Gibraltar Cup, also known as the Senior Cup 2014-15, is the 2nd edition of the Gibraltar Premier Cup, a competition for the teams in the Gibraltar Premier Division, the top tier of football in Gibraltar.

Format
The eight teams from the Gibraltar Premier Division are split into two groups of four teams. The teams play each other once. The top two teams from each group advance to single-leg semifinals. The two semifinal winners play each other in a single match for the Cup.

Groups

Group A

Group B

Semifinals
The top two teams from each group advance to the semifinals.

Final

References

External links
 Gibraltar Football Association
 soccerway.com
 Gibraltar League Cup at futbol24.com
 gibfootballtalk.com

League Cup Gibraltar
League Cup
Football competitions in Gibraltar